SKIP is an acronym for Skeletal muscle and kidney enriched inositol phosphatase, which is a human gene.

Function 

This gene encodes a protein with 5-phosphatase activity toward polyphosphate inositol. The protein localizes to the cytosol in regions lacking actin stress fibers. It is thought that this protein may negatively regulate the actin cytoskeleton. Alternative splicing of this gene results in two transcript variants encoding different isoforms. Overexpression of SKIP in mice affects osmoregulation in kidney collecting ducts.

References

Further reading